Chenango County is a county located in the south-central section U.S. state of New York. As of the 2020 census, the population was 47,220. Its county seat is Norwich. The county's name originates from an Oneida word meaning 'large bull-thistle'.

History
This was long the territory of the Oneida people, one of the first Five Nations of the Iroquois Confederacy or Haudenosaunee. They occupied the area until after the Revolutionary War, when they were forced off the land, although they had been allies of the patriot colonists. They were granted a small reservation, which settlers continued to encroach on.

When English colonists organized counties in 1683 in what is now  New York, the present Chenango County was part of Albany County. This was an enormous county, including the northern part of New York State as well as all of the present State of Vermont and, in theory, extending westward to the Pacific Ocean. However, territories located to the west of present-day Pennsylvania were under effective French control as part of New France. Albany County was reduced in size on July 3, 1766, by the creation of Cumberland County, and further on March 16, 1770, by the creation of Gloucester County, both containing territory now in Vermont.

On March 12, 1772, what was left of Albany County was split into three parts, one remaining under the name Albany County. One of the other pieces, Tryon County, contained the western portion (and thus, since no western boundary was specified, theoretically still extended west to the Pacific). The eastern boundary of Tryon County was approximately five miles west of the present city of Schenectady, and the county included the western part of the Adirondack Mountains and the area west of the West Branch of the Delaware River. The area then designated as Tryon County has since been organized as 37 counties of New York State. The county was named for William Tryon, the British colonial governor of New York.

In the years prior to 1776, during the increasing tensions most of the Loyalists in Tryon County fled to Fort Niagara on the Western Frontier. In 1784, following the peace treaty that ended the American Revolutionary War, the Americans renamed Tryon County as Montgomery County in honor of the US general, Richard Montgomery. He had captured several places in Canada and died attempting to capture the city of Quebec. The US residents replaced the name of the former British governor.

In 1788, the Oneida Reservation was considerably reduced by what is known as Clinton's Purchase, when land was sold off west of the Unadilla River to create what are now 20 towns. (See map to the right.) Settlers from eastern New York and New England entered the area and began farming.

In 1789, Montgomery County was reduced in size by the splitting-off of Ontario County. The area split off from Montgomery County was much larger than the present Ontario County, as it included the present Allegany, Cattaraugus, Chautauqua, Erie, Genesee, Livingston, Monroe, Niagara, Orleans, Steuben, Wyoming, Yates, and part of Schuyler and Wayne counties. It was the practice to establish a large geographic county and divide it as settlement increased.

In 1791, Herkimer, Otsego and Tioga counties were organized from land separated from Montgomery County.

Its eastern border is formed by the Unadilla River. The land had been purchased the previous year from the Oneida, who were forced into a smaller reservation to the north.

On April 4, 1804,  of Chenango County was partitioned to expand Oneida County; the communities of Waterville and Sangerfield were assigned to the new Oneida County.

On March 21, 1806,  of Chenango County was partitioned to produce Madison County. This established the current borders of Chenango County, which have been maintained to the early 21st century. This area was developed for agriculture in the nineteenth century and is still largely rural.

Geography

Chenango County is in the approximate center of the state, located west of Albany, north of Binghamton, and southeast of Syracuse. The county is considered to be in the Southern Tier region of New York State.

The Chenango River, a tributary of the Susquehanna River, flows southward through the county.

Adjacent counties
 Madison County - north
 Otsego County - northeast
 Delaware County - southeast
 Broome County - south
 Cortland County - west

Demographics

2020 Census

2000 Census 
As of the census of 2000, there were 51,401 people, 19,926 households, and 13,549 families residing in the county. The population density was 58 people per square mile (22/km2). There were 23,890 housing units at an average density of 27 per square mile (10/km2). The racial makeup of the county was 97.65% White, 0.82% Black or African American, 0.27% Native American, 0.28% Asian, 0.02% Pacific Islander, 0.22% from other races, and 0.74% from two or more races. 1.07% of the population were Hispanic or Latino of any race. 20.2% were of English, 14.5% German, 13.8% Irish, 12.3% American and 8.9% Italian ancestry according to Census 2000 . 96.7% spoke English and 1.3% Spanish as their first language.

There were 19,926 households, out of which 32.50% had children under the age of 18 living with them, 53.10% were married couples living together, 9.80% had a female householder with no husband present, and 32.00% were non-families. 26.10% of all households were made up of individuals, and 11.40% had someone living alone who was 65 years of age or older. The average household size was 2.52 and the average family size was 3.01.

In the county, the population was spread out, with 26.20% under the age of 18, 7.00% from 18 to 24, 27.50% from 25 to 44, 24.40% from 45 to 64, and 14.90% who were 65 years of age or older. The median age was 38 years. For every 100 females there were 97.00 males. For every 100 females age 18 and over, there were 94.70 males.

The median income for a household in the county was $33,679, and the median income for a family was $39,711. Males had a median income of $30,363 versus $22,429 for females. The per capita income for the county was $16,427.  About 10.70% of families and 14.40% of the population were below the poverty line, including 19.50% of those under age 18 and 8.70% of those age 65 or over.

Government

|}

Chenango County has a Board of Supervisors that consists of 23 Town/City elected officials, serving as representatives at the County level. The term for each Supervisor is based on the term set by each particular Town. A Supervisor holds office for either two or four years.

In 21st-century United States politics, Chenango County is considered a "red" county, where the majority of voters elect national Republican candidates. In 2004, Republican George Bush won by an 11% margin over Democrat John Kerry. For state and congressional offices, voters sometimes elect Democratic candidates. In 2006 both Eliot Spitzer and Hillary Clinton carried it, winning 57% and 54% of the vote for governor and US Senator, respectively. In 2008, John McCain carried Chenango County over Barack Obama in the presidential election by a close margin of 49.59%-48.45% or a difference of 237 votes. In 2010, Democrat Andrew Cuomo for governor, and Democrats Chuck Schumer and Kirsten Gillibrand for the US Senate each carried it.

Education
Morrisville State College has a branch in Norwich.

Communities
Norwich, the county seat, is the only city in Chenango County.

In addition to the city of Norwich, the county has the following named settlements:

Towns
In New York, a "town" is a political subdivision (synonymous with township). The towns in northern Chenango County originated from the Twenty Townships ceded by the Oneida tribe to the State of New York.

 Afton
 Bainbridge
 Columbus
 Coventry
 German
 Greene
 Guilford
 Lincklaen
 McDonough
 New Berlin
 North Norwich
 Norwich
 Otselic
 Oxford
 Pharsalia
 Pitcher
 Plymouth
 Preston
 Sherburne
 Smithville
 Smyrna

Villages

 Afton
 Bainbridge
 Earlville
 Greene
 New Berlin
 Oxford
 Sherburne
 Smyrna

Census-designated places
 Guilford
 Smithville Flats

Hamlets
 Holmesville
 Mount Upton
 Rockdale
 South Plymouth

Notable people
 Allen Aaron Cook an architect, was born here in 1832
 Nancy Matthews Elliott was born here in 1810 and became the mother of Thomas Edison.
 Serranus Clinton Hastings, U.S. Congressman and founder of the Hastings College of the Law at University of California

See also

 List of counties in New York
 National Register of Historic Places listings in Chenango County, New York

References

Further reading
 NEW YORK: Atlas of Historical County Boundaries; Compiled by Kathryn Ford Thorne; Edited by John H. Long.

External links
 
  Chenango County, NY government
 Chenango County "Online Visitors Travel Guide"
 
  Chenango County GenWeb
  Chenango County Chamber of Commerce
 Chenango County Democratic Committee
 '' The Evening Sun, Chenango County newspaper
 Chenango Semi-Weekly Telegraph, Google news archive. —PDFs of 2,579 issues, dating from 1877 through 1934.

 
1798 establishments in New York (state)
Populated places established in 1798
Counties of Appalachia
New York placenames of Native American origin